Ignatius Cardinal Suharyo Hardjoatmodjo (born 9 July 1950) is an Indonesian prelate of the Catholic Church. He has been Archbishop of Jakarta since 2010, after serving as Archbishop of Semarang from 1997 to 2009. He is commonly known as Archbishop Suharyo.

Pope Francis raised him to the rank of cardinal on 5 October 2019.

Biography
Ignatius Suharyo Hardjoatmodjo was born on 9 July 1950 in Sedayu, Bantul, Yogyakarta, Indonesia. He is the seventh of ten siblings. His brothers are Yohanes Subagyo & Suitbertus Ari Sunardi O.C.S.O. and his sisters are Christina Sri Murni F.M.M. & Maria Magdalena Marganingsih P.M.Y. He graduated St. Peter Canisius Minor seminary in Mertoyudan, Central Java in 1968. He completed his undergraduate degree in Philosophy and Theology at Sanata Dharma University, Yogyakarta in 1971 and doctoral degree in biblical studies from the Pontifical Urbaniana University, Rome, in 1981.

He was ordained priest of Archdiocese of Semarang on 26 January 1976. He joined the faculty of philosophy in Jakarta from 1981 to 1991 and headed the faculty of philosophy and sociology in Santa Dharma from 1983 to 1993. He was dean on the faculty of theology at Santa Dharma from 1993 to 1997.

Pope John Paul II appointed him Archbishop of Semarang on 21 April 1997, and he received episcopal consecration from Cardinal Julius Darmaatmadja on 22 August 1997. He chose as his episcopal motto Cum Omni Humiltate serviens Domino ("Serving the Lord with all humility") from Acts 20:19. While in that post, he served as secretary general of the Bishops' Conference of Indonesia, and a member of the Office of Ecumenical and Interreligious Affairs of the Federation of Asian Bishops' Conferences. He was elected secretary general of the Episcopal Conference of Indonesia in 2000 and vice president of the Conference in 2006. In 2002 he participated in the Synod of Bishops on The Word of God in the Life and Mission of the Church.

He was also appointed Ordinary of the Indonesian Military Forces Ordinariate on 2 January 2006.

On 25 July 2009, Pope Benedict XVI appointed him Coadjutor Archbishop of Jakarta. He became Archbishop of Jakarta on 28 June 2010, when Pope Benedict XVI accepted the resignation of Julius Cardinal Darmaatmadja. At Christmas 2012, he protested the roadblocks Indonesian Christian face in getting permission to construct churches on their own property.

On 13 September 2014, Pope Francis named him a member of the Congregation for the Evangelisation People.

He was elected the president of the Episcopal Conference of Indonesia in 2012.

He also attended the Synod of Bishops on the New Evangelisation in October 2012 where he advocated for allowing regional bishops' conferences greater authority over translations of the Missal, noting the negative associations attached in Indonesia to the word spirit, which if unmodified indicates an evil spirit. He also notes the appeal of the vernacular in Catholic prayer in contrast to the Arabic used only for prayer by the Muslim majority in Indonesia. He also attended the Synod of Bishops in October 2015.

On 1 September 2019, Pope Francis announced he would make him a cardinal, the third from Indonesia. On 5 October 2019, Pope Francis made him Cardinal Priest of Spirito Santo alla Ferratella. He was made a member of the Congregation for the Evangelization of Peoples on 21 February 2020.

See also
Cardinals created by Francis
Catholic Church in Indonesia

References

External links

1950 births
Living people
Javanese people
Indonesian cardinals
20th-century Roman Catholic archbishops in Indonesia
21st-century Roman Catholic archbishops in Indonesia
People from Bantul Regency
Cardinals created by Pope Francis
Pontifical Urban University alumni
Bishops appointed by Pope John Paul II